Okko is a comic book series by Hub.

Okko may also refer to:

 OKKO, a network of filling complexes in Ukraine
 Okko Kamu (born 1946), a Finnish conductor and violinist
 OK K.O.! Let's Be Heroes, an American superhero comedy animated series created by Ian Jones-Quartey
Oriko "Okko" Seki, the protagonist of the novel series Okko's Inn and the anime series and film based on it

See also
 Oko (disambiguation)